Meche Marchand, who now goes by the name of Rivka Marchand, is an actress and author.

Marchand was born in Puerto Rico where she was a radio, television and stage actress. She lived in Orlando, Florida where she worked as a Court Interpreter, Hebrew teacher and recording talent for several studios.  She is the mother of soprano Yolanda Vadiz, who died in December, 1987. Marchand was once married to celebrity Luis Antonio Cosme.

She is the author of Manual de Consejitos Utiles, Mi Camino, mi Verdad, mi Yolanda; and co-author of the cook book Friendo y Comiendo. Her most recent work is Valgame Dios - Exposicion de la historia, cultura, lenguaje y religion de un pueblo que nos afecta a todos. She made Aliyah (moved to Israel) in 2005, and now lives in Jerusalem.

References

External links
Libros en red online book source

American emigrants to Israel
Israeli women writers
Year of birth missing (living people)
Living people
Israeli non-fiction writers
Jewish actresses